The 1979 Miami Hurricanes baseball team represented the University of Miami in the 1979 NCAA Division I baseball season. The Hurricanes played their home games at Mark Light Field. The team was coached by Ron Fraser in his 17th season at Miami.

Personnel

Roster

Coaches

Schedule and results

References

Miami Hurricanes baseball seasons
Miami Hurricanes
College World Series seasons
Miami Hurricanes baseball